Southern Presbyterian Church may refer to
 The Presbyterian Church in the United States
 Southern Presbyterian Church (Australia)

See also
 South Presbyterian Church